Steven Philip "Steve" Heard (born 29 April 1962 in Tunbridge Wells) is a retired English middle-distance runner who competed primarily in the 800 metres. He represented his country at the 1992 Summer Olympics as well as 1991 World Championships reaching the semifinals on both occasions. In addition, he won a gold medal at the 1989 European Indoor Championships.

International competitions

Personal bests
Outdoor
400 metres – 45.74 (Antrim 1985)
600 metres – 1:14.95 (London 1991)
800 metres – 1:44.65 (Koblenz 1992)
Indoor
400 metres – 46.83 (Budapest 1987)
600 metres – 1:17.62 (Cosford 1987)
800 metres – 1:48.84 (Den Haag 1989)

References

All-Athletics profile

External links

1962 births
Living people
People from Royal Tunbridge Wells
English male middle-distance runners
Olympic athletes of Great Britain
Athletes (track and field) at the 1992 Summer Olympics
World Athletics Championships athletes for Great Britain